Marina di Marittima is a seaside resort on the Adriatic coast of Salento in the comune of Diso in the province of Lecce in the Apulia region of southeast Italy. It takes its name from the frazione that is located in the hinterland: Marittima.

Frazioni of the Province of Lecce